The sea lettuces comprise the genus Ulva, a group of edible green algae that is widely distributed along the coasts of the world's oceans. The type species within the genus Ulva is Ulva lactuca, lactuca being Latin for "lettuce". The genus also includes the species previously classified under the genus Enteromorpha, the former members of which are known under the common name green nori.

Description
Individual blades of Ulva can grow to be more than 400 mm (16 in) in size, but this occurs only when the plants are growing in sheltered areas. A macroscopic alga which is light to dark green in colour, it is attached by disc holdfast. Their structure is a leaflike flattened thallus.

Nutrition and contamination
Sea lettuce is eaten by a number of different sea animals, including manatees and the sea slugs known as sea hares. Many species of sea lettuce are a food source for humans in Scandinavia, Great Britain, Ireland, China, and Japan (where this food is known as aosa). Sea lettuce as a food for humans is eaten raw in salads and cooked in soups. It is high in protein, soluble dietary fiber, and a variety of vitamins and minerals, especially iron. However, contamination with toxic heavy metals at certain sites where it can be collected makes it dangerous for human consumption.

Aquarium trade
Sea lettuce species are commonly found in the saltwater aquarium trade, where the plants are valued for their high nutrient uptake and edibility. Many reef aquarium keepers use sea lettuce species in refugia or grow it as a food source for herbivorous fish. Sea lettuce is very easy to keep, tolerating a wide range of lighting and temperature conditions. In the refugium, sea lettuce can be attached to live rock or another surface, or simply left to drift in the water.

Health concerns
In August 2009, unprecedented amounts of these algae washed up on the beaches of Brittany, France, causing a major public health scare as it decomposed. The rotting leaves produced large quantities of hydrogen sulfide, a toxic gas. In one incident near Saint-Michel-en-Grève, a horse rider lost consciousness and his horse died after breathing the seaweed fumes; in another, a lorry driver driving a load of decomposing sea lettuce passed out, crashed, and died, with toxic fumes claimed to be the cause. Environmentalists blamed the phenomenon on excessive nitrogenous compounds washed out to sea from improper disposal of pig and poultry animal waste from industrial farms.

Species
Species in the genus Ulva include:

Accepted species

Ulva acanthophora (Kützing) Hayden, Blomster, Maggs, P.C. Silva, Stanhope & J.R. Waaland, 2003
Ulva anandii Amjad & Shameel, 1993
Ulva arasakii Chihara, 1969
Ulva atroviridis Levring, 1938
Ulva australis Areschoug, 1854
Ulva beytensis Thivy & Sharma, 1966
Ulva bifrons Ardré, 1967
Ulva brevistipita V.J. Chapman, 1956
Ulva burmanica (Zeller) De Toni, 1889
Ulva californica Wille, 1899
Ulva chaetomorphoides (Børgesen) Hayden, Blomster, Maggs, P.C. Silva, M.J. Stanhope & J.R. Waaland, 2003
Ulva clathrata (Roth) C. Agardh, 1811
Ulva compressa Linnaeus, 1753
Ulva conglobata Kjellman, 1897
Ulva cornuta Lightfoot, 1777
Ulva covelongensis V. Krishnamurthy & H. Joshi, 1969
Ulva crassa V.J. Chapman, 1956
Ulva crassimembrana (V.J. Chapman) Hayden, Blomster, Maggs, P.C. Silva, M.J. Stanhope & J.R. Waaland, 2003
Ulva curvata (Kützing) De Toni, 1889
Ulva denticulata P.J.L. Dangeard, 1959
Ulva diaphana Hudson, 1778
Ulva elegans Gayral, 1960
Ulva enteromorpha Le Jolis, 1863
Ulva erecta (Lyngbye) Fries
Ulva expansa (Setchell) Setchell & N.L. Gardner, 1920
Ulva fasciata Delile, 1813
Ulva flexuosa Wulfen, 1803
Ulva geminoidea V.J. Chapman, 1956
Ulva gigantea (Kützing) Bliding, 1969
Ulva grandis Saifullah & Nizamuddin, 1977
Ulva hookeriana (Kützing) Hayden, Blomster, Maggs, P.C. Silva, M.J. Stanhope & J.R. Waaland
Ulva hopkirkii (M'Calla ex Harvey) P. Crouan & H. Crouan
Ulva howensis (A.H.S. Lucas) Kraft, 2007
Ulva indica Roth, 1806
Ulva intestinalis Linnaeus, 1753
Ulva intestinaloides (R.P.T. Koeman & Hoek) Hayden, Blomster, Maggs, P.C. Silva, M.J. Stanhope & J.R. Waaland, 2003
Ulva javanica N.L. Burman, 1768
Ulva kylinii (Bliding) Hayden, Blomster, Maggs, P.C. Silva, M.J. Stanhope & J.R. Waaland, 2003
Ulva lactuca Linnaeus, 1753
Ulva laetevirens J.E. Areschoug, 1854
Ulva laingii V.J. Chapman, 1956
Ulva linearis P.J.L. Dangeard, 1957
Ulva linza Linnaeus, 1753
Ulva lippii Lamouroux
Ulva litoralis Suhr ex Kützing
Ulva littorea Suhr
Ulva lobata (Kützing) Harvey, 1855
Ulva marginata (J. Agardh) Le Jolis
Ulva micrococca (Kützing) Gobi
Ulva mutabilis Föyn, 1958
Ulva neapolitana Bliding, 1960
Ulva nematoidea Bory de Saint-Vincent, 1828
Ulva ohnoi Hiraoka & Shimada, 2004
Ulva olivascens P.J.L. Dangeard
Ulva pacifica Endlicher
Ulva papenfussii Pham-Hoang Hô, 1969
Ulva parva V.J. Chapman, 1956
Ulva paschima Bast
Ulva patengensis Salam & Khan, 1981
Ulva percursa (C. Agardh) C. Agardh
Ulva pertusa Kjellman, 1897
Ulva phyllosa (V.J. Chapman) Papenfuss
Ulva polyclada Kraft, 2007
Ulva popenguinensis P.J.L. Dangeard, 1958
Ulva porrifolia (S.G. Gmelin) J.F. Gmelin
Ulva profunda W.R. Taylor, 1928
Ulva prolifera O.F.Müller, 1778
Ulva pseudocurvata Koeman & Hoek, 1981
Ulva pseudolinza (R.P.T. Koeman & Hoek) Hayden, Blomster, Maggs, P.C. Silva, M.J. Stanhope & J.R. Waaland, 2003
Ulva pulchra Jaasund, 1976
Ulva quilonensis Sindhu & Panikkar, 1995
Ulva radiata (J. Agardh) Hayden, Blomster, Maggs, P.C. Silva, M.J. Stanhope & J.R. Waaland, 2003
Ulva ralfsii (Harvey) Le Jolis, 1863
Ulva ranunculata Kraft & A.J.K. Millar, 2000
Ulva reticulata Forsskål, 1775
Ulva rhacodes (Holmes) Papenfuss, 1960
Ulva rigida C. Agardh, 1823
Ulva rotundata Bliding, 1968
Ulva saifullahii Amjad & Shameel, 1993
Ulva serrata A.P.de Candolle
Ulva simplex (K.L. Vinogradova) Hayden, Blomster, Maggs, P.C. Silva, M.J. Stanhope & J.R. Waaland, 2003
Ulva sorensenii V.J. Chapman, 1956
Ulva spinulosa Okamura & Segawa, 1936
Ulva stenophylla Setchell & N.L. Gardner, 1920
Ulva sublittoralis Segawa, 1938
Ulva subulata (Wulfen) Naccari
Ulva taeniata (Setchell) Setchell & N.L. Gardner, 1920
Ulva tanneri H.S. Hayden & J.R. Waaland, 2003
Ulva tenera Kornmann & Sahling
Ulva torta (Mertens) Trevisan, 1841
Ulva tuberosa Palisot de Beauvois
Ulva uncialis (Kützing) Montagne, 1850
Ulva uncinata Mohr
Ulva uncinata Mertens
Ulva usneoides Bonnemaison
Ulva utricularis (Roth) C. Agardh
Ulva utriculosa C. Agardh
Ulva uvoides Bory de Saint-Vincent
Ulva ventricosa A.P.de Candolle

Nomina dubia
Ulva costata Wollny, 1881 
Ulva repens Clemente, 1807 
Ulva tetragona A.P.de Candolle, 1807 

A newly discovered Indian endemic species of Ulva with tubular thallus indistinguishable from Ulva intestinalis has been formally established in 2014 as Ulva paschima Bast.
Ten new species have been discovered in New Caledonia: Ulva arbuscula, Ulva planiramosa, Ulva batuffolosa, Ulva tentaculosa, Ulva finissima, Ulva pluriramosa, Ulva scolopendra and Ulva spumosa.

References
nissima,

External links
 Marine botany: Ulva
 
 Toxic seaweed clogs French coas Caledonia: morphological diversity, and blooom potential.t (BBC)

Ulvaceae
Edible seaweeds
Edible algae
Taxa named by Carl Linnaeus